Ghantaa (Marathi: घंटा) is a 2016 Indian Marathi language comedy film produced and directed by Shailesh Shankar Kale.  The movie stars Amey Wagh, Aroh Welankar and Saksham Kulkarni in the lead roles.

The film is based on the antics of three young men who end up in trouble while betting on cricket matches.  Ghantaa was released on 14 October 2016 in India.

Cast 

Amey Wagh as Raj
Aroh Welankar as Angad
Saksham Kulkarni as Umesh
Anuja Sathe as Komal Bhabhi
Pushkar Shrotri as Digya Bhai
Kishor Kadam as Chintya Bhai
Shivani Surve as Anagha
Abhijeet Chavan as Mahesh Kalani
Murli Sharma as Sanjay Hegde
Arun Kadam as Pichkya
Mayur Khandge as Gajju
Vinod Jadhav as Gajju Gang's member
Vijay Andalkar as Salman Khan
Viju Khote as Kalani's grandpa
Ganesh Mayekar as Khajvya
Kanchan Pagare as Sanjay
Amol Parchure as News Reporter
Sagar Satpute as Punter

Plot 

Angad, Raaj and Umesh are three chuddy buddies. They all have their independent personalities but would die for the bonding they share with each other. Everything they do in each other's company and now it is their life taking shape, challenging the friendship.
 
Umesh is tech-geek, wanting to have his own social media site. He keeps posting the super PJs all the time. Angad struggling to become a dubbing artist and having a studio of his own. Raaj doesn't really know what he would do apart from a modelling agency. But one thing is hard-rock clear for them - they have to earn bucks for their dreams - bending down to the destiny or twicking it, anyway.

The motto of life here is Give it a shot or get - Ghantaa. Ghantaa literally means bells but in colloquial means bollocks.   So, try till you get something, at least Ghantaa. Everyone prays for one golden opportunity to ring the bells but when this opportunity appears in front of you, does one really able to grab it ?? Funniest answer to this question is Ghantaa. 
The rat race in career, pressures for the girl friend's folks to settle as early as possible and the risky temptations luring one around. None can escape the mess- gangsters, police, the wannabe politicians, party workers, businessmen, could the three smart but well meaning youngsters can achieve their dreams through this mess.

Soundtrack 

Music for this film is composed by Samir Saptiskar  while lyrics are penned by Abhishek Khankar.

Critical reception

Mihir Bhanage of The Times of India gave the film a rating of 3 out of 5 saying that, "Comedy is a risky business; you either make people laugh genuinely or end up evoking helpless guffaws owing to ridiculous jokes. 'Ghantaa', however, falls in between these two extremes. If you are looking for a no-brainer that makes you laugh, 'Ghantaa' is a good bet." Abhay Salvi of Marathi Stars gave the film a rating of 2.5 out of 5 and said that, "Ghantaa is enjoyable & definitely worth a watch, the errors are there but they won’t hit you on the face." Ulhas Shirke of Marathi Movie World gave the film a rating of 2.5 out of 5 saying that, "All in all, ‘Ghantaa‘ has turned out to be neither a family entertainer, nor a sensible film to fit into quality Marathi film. All that it offers is a casual adult comedy." Amol Parchure of Film Companion called the film a brainless comedy but appreciated the graphics, music and the acting performances of Amey Wagh and Anuja Sathe and gave the film a rating of 2.5 out of 5.

References

External links
 

2010s Marathi-language films